Thionin: a protein.
Thionine: an organic dye.
(2Z,4Z,6Z,8Z)-Thionine: a simple heterocycle compound.